In Ancient Greek philosophy, techne is a philosophical concept that refers to making or doing, Technē is similar to the concept of epistēmē in the implication of knowledge of principles. However, Aristotle distinguishes clearly between the two, and even Plato seems to draw a distinction between them in some of his dialogues. Richard Parry (2003) writes that Aristotle believed technē aims for good and forms an end, which could be the activity itself or a product formed from the activity. Aristotle used health as an example of an end that is produced from the techne of medicine. To make a distinction between technē and arete, he said the value of technē is the end product while arete values choosing the action that promotes the best moral good.

References

Further reading

 Dunne, Joseph. 1997. Back to the Rough Ground: 'Phronesis' and Techne in Modern Philosophy and in Aristotle. Notre Dame, IN: University of Notre Dame Press. .

Concepts in ancient Greek epistemology